Halley Wegryn Gross (born December 27, 1985) is an American screenwriter and former actress. She is best known for writing two 2016 episodes of the HBO series Westworld and co-writing the 2020 video game The Last of Us Part II.

Early life
Halley Wegryn Gross was born in Fort Myers, Florida, on December 27, 1985. She grew up in New Jersey. She was a child actress who made appearances on Law & Order and later wanted to become a comedian while in college, but found that comedy made her uncomfortable. She attended the Gallatin School of Individualized Study at New York University (NYU) as an undergraduate. She graduated with a degree in creative writing in 2008 and then gained a master's degree in dramaturgy from NYU in 2010.

Career
Before moving into screenwriting, Gross worked as an actress and appeared onstage in a 2005 production of Hurlyburly, a 2011 production of The Metal Children, and a 2012 production of A Midsummer Night's Dream. She had her breakthrough as a writer and story editor for two 2016 episodes of the HBO television series Westworld. She was also a writer for two episodes of the 2019 Amazon miniseries Too Old to Die Young. In 2020, she co-wrote the video game The Last of Us Part II with Neil Druckmann. The game went on to win multiple awards, some of which were awarded to Gross and Druckmann for their writing. The game also broke the record for the most Game of the Year awards received by a single game.

Filmography

Screenwriter
 Banshee – TV series, episode "Snakes and Whatnot" (2015)
 Westworld – TV series, episodes "The Adversary" and "Trompe L'Oeil" (2016)
 Emerald City – TV series, episode "Everybody Lies" (2017)
 Too Old to Die Young – TV series (2019)
 The Last of Us Part II – video game – co-writer, narrative lead (2020)

Accolades

References

External links

1985 births
Living people
American television writers
Naughty Dog people
New York University alumni
Screenwriters from Florida
People from Fort Myers, Florida
Video game writers
American women television writers
21st-century American women writers
21st-century American screenwriters